
All times shown are US EDT.◄

Pool Play

Pool A

Central 12, Oregon D4 1

Latin America 9, Europe and Africa 0

Central 18, Europe and Africa 0

Southeast 11, Oregon D4 1

Southeast 9, Latin America 5

2013 in softball
Little League Softball World Series